Philippa Smyth (born 9 September 1995) is an Australian rules footballer who played for the Greater Western Sydney Giants in the AFL Women's competition (AFLW). Smythe was drafted by the Giants with their fifth selection and the 73rd pick overall in the 2017 AFL Women's draft. She was delisted by Greater Western Sydney at the end of the 2018 season.

References

External links 

1995 births
Living people
Greater Western Sydney Giants (AFLW) players
Australian rules footballers from New South Wales